Liozna is a town in Vitebsk Region, Belarus, and the administrative center of Liozna District. It is located close to the border with Russia by the Vitebsk-Smolensk railroad branch and highway, on the Moshna River.  Population: 6,753 (2005).

History 
The first known record of the Liozno shtetl (small town with a high Jewish population) is dated 1654.

During World War II, Liozna was under German occupation from 17 July 1941 until 8 October 1943.

Notable people associated with Liozna 

 Marc Chagall, Belarusian-French painter
 Schneur Zalman, the first Rebbe of the Chabad-Lubavitch Hasidic dynasty
 Dovber Schneuri, the second Rebbe of the Chabad-Lubavitch Hasidic dynasty 
 Menachem Mendel Schneersohn, the third Rebbe of the Chabad-Lubavitch Hasidic dynasty

External links 
 Liozno home page
 Liozno book memory
 Liozno newspaper "Styag Peramogi"
 Liozno satellite image
 The murder of the Jews of Liozna during World War II, at Yad Vashem website

References

Urban-type settlements in Belarus
Populated places in Vitebsk Region
Vitebsk Voivodeship
Orshansky Uyezd
Holocaust locations in Belarus